Josef Bock (11 February 1883 – 15 May 1966) was an Austrian sculptor. His work was part of the sculpture event in the art competition at the 1932 Summer Olympics.

References

1883 births
1966 deaths
20th-century Austrian sculptors
Austrian male sculptors
Olympic competitors in art competitions
Artists from Vienna
20th-century Austrian male artists